Ad Dakhiliyah (meaning: The Interior) is one of the governorates (muhafazah) of Oman with Nizwa town as the regional center. It was previously a region (mintaqah). It became a governorate on 28 October 2011.

Provinces
Ad Dakhiliyah Governorate consists of eight provinces (wilayat):
Nizwa
Samail
Bahla
Adam
Al Hamra
Manah
Izki
Bid Bid

Demographics

References

 
Governorates of Oman